Jon Østeng Hov (23 January 1936 − 29 March 2019) was a Norwegian photographer and writer. He was particularly known for his flower photos, and was a columnist in Adresseavisen for over thirty years.

Hov was an honorary member of the Norwegian Society for the Conservation of Nature, and was decorated Knight, First Class of the Order of St. Olav in 2005.

References

1936 births
2019 deaths
People from Holtålen
Norwegian photographers
Nature photographers
Norwegian columnists
Norwegian nature writers
Norwegian environmentalists
Order of Saint Olav